Randfontein Local Municipality was a local municipality in West Rand District Municipality, Gauteng, in South Africa. After municipal elections on 3 August 2016, it was merged with the Westonaria Local Municipality to form the larger Rand West City Local Municipality.

Randfontein Local Municipality is characterized by high levels of unemployment, poverty, major crime, and low levels of education and income. Nonetheless, it has become the migration destination for many South Africans seeking a better quality of life in Gauteng. "Integrated Development Plan 2009 - 2010." The Randfontein Local Municipality. Retrieved on Oct 6, 2009.</ref>

Main places
The 2001 census divided the municipality into the following main places:

Politics
The municipal council consists of forty-four members elected by mixed-member proportional representation. Twenty-two councillors are elected by first-past-the-post voting in twenty-two wards, while the remaining twenty-two are chosen from party lists so that the total number of party representatives is proportional to the number of votes received. In the election of 18 May 2011 the African National Congress (ANC) won a majority of twenty-seven seats on the council.
The following table shows the results of the election.

References

External links
 Official website 

Former local municipalities of South Africa